The Gloster IV was a British racing floatplane of the 1920s. A single-engined biplane, the Gloster IV was a development of the earlier Gloster III intended to compete in the 1927 Schneider Trophy race. One aircraft competed in the race, but retired part way through.  The three aircraft built continued to be used as trainers by the High Speed Flight for several years.

Design and development
To compete for the 1927 Schneider Trophy, Britain's Air Ministry was determined to improve Britain's performance for the last few competitions, with British entries being soundly beaten by American Curtiss floatplanes in 1923 and 1925, and failing to even enter the 1926 competition which was won by the Italian Macchi M.39. To improve on this disappointing state of affairs, the Air Ministry placed orders for designs of high speed floatplanes from Gloster, Supermarine (the S.5) and Shorts (the Crusader).

Gloster's design, the Gloster IV was a development of the Gloster III which had finished second in the 1925 race.  Henry Folland, the Chief designer of Gloster, redesigned the aircraft to reduce drag. Like its predecessors, the Gloster IV was of wooden construction, with a monocoque fuselage and single bay wings. Both the upper and lower wings were gulled to allow the drag of the wing/fuselage junction to be minimised, while radiators were built into the surfaces of the wings and floats.

Three aircraft were built, differing in the surface area of the wings and the arrangement of the tail.

Operational history
The three Gloster IVs were first flown in July–August 1927, with the two short-span aircraft (the Gloster IVA and IVB) being shipped to Venice in August 1927.  The Gloster IVB was finally chosen to compete with the two S.5s in the race, the Crusader having crashed due to having its control cables crossed on re-assembly.

On the day of the race, 26 September 1927, the Gloster IVB, piloted by Flight Lieutenant Samuel Kinkead was the first aircraft to take off, completing five laps before retiring, with the race being won by Flight Lieutenant Sidney Webster flying the S.5. On inspection, it was found that the Gloster's propeller shaft was seriously cracked and would probably have failed if Kinkead had not retired.

Following the race, the Gloster IVA and IVB were returned to the United Kingdom, where they were modified to improve the pilot's view by raising the upper wing and used as high speed trainers. They were used to train pilots for the 1929 race, with the IVB crashing during a landing accident in December 1930 and the IVA used again as a trainer for the 1931 race.  The original Gloster IV was meanwhile sold with the intention of being converted to a landplane and used in attempt on the world air speed record but these plans came to nothing.

Variants
Gloster IV
Serial number N224. Original larger wings. Powered by 900 hp (671 kW) direct-drive Napier Lion VIIA.
Gloster IVA
Serial number N222. Reduced span wings and modified tail. Powered by direct-drive Lion VIIA
Gloster IVB
Serial number N223. Reduced span wings and powered by geared Napier Lion VIIB engine.

Operators

Royal Air Force
High Speed Flight

Specifications (Gloster IVB)

See also
Gloster II
Gloster III
 Gloster VI
Supermarine S.5
Macchi M.52

References

James, Derek J. Gloster Aircraft since 1917. London:Putnam, 1971. .
Mondey, David. "Britain Captures Schneider Trophy". Air Enthusiast, Seventeen, December 1981 – March 1982. Bromley, Kent, UK:Pilot Press. pp. 36–50.

External links

Painting of Gloster IV

1920s British sport aircraft
Gull-wing aircraft
Schneider Trophy
Floatplanes
IV
Single-engined tractor aircraft
Biplanes
Aircraft first flown in 1927
Sesquiplanes